David Allen Patterson, Silver Wolf (Adelv unegv Waya) was a professor, researcher, author, and Native American advocate. He was the first American Indian professor in the George Warren Brown School of Social Work at Washington University in St. Louis. He is known for his research and active involvement in Native American health, retention of Native American college students, treatment retention for alcohol and drug addiction, and finding solutions to barriers to best practices adoption in community-based organizations.

David Patterson wrote a blog on Native American wellness and published academic work on the subjects of education, mental health and addiction.

Biography 

David Allen Patterson was born in Kentucky to Betty (née Allen) and Coleman Sidwell Patterson, the youngest of their three sons. He is of Cherokee and Irish heritage.

After dropping out of high school in 1982, David struggled with alcoholism, drug addiction, depression and a suicide attempt at age 18. He entered a psychiatric hospital in 1989, where he stayed for five weeks.

David earned his GED and began working as a garbage man for Waste Management in his mid-twenties. In 1990, he considered taking college classes and sought assistance through Vocational Rehabilitation in Kentucky. He was evaluated as having dyslexia, ADHD and learning disabilities, labeled "mildly mentally retarded [sic]" and was told he was not "college material." This evaluation became the starting point of a new life for Patterson, one devoted to education, addiction treatment and rehabilitation, and advocacy.

Education, career, and community contributions 

Going against the advice of Vocational Rehabilitation, David Patterson quit his job, sold most of his belongings and entered Volunteers of America as an unpaid resident manager in 1991. He began taking classes at Jefferson Community College in Louisville, KY. He lived at the VOA for over two years while attending community college. He went on to attend Spalding University, and graduated with a Bachelor of Social Work in 1996. Patterson completed a master's degree in Social Work in 1997 and became a certified social worker in 1998. He graduated with his Ph.D. from the University of Louisville's Kent School of Social Work in 2006.

During his tenure at the University at Buffalo, he founded a number of programs to benefit Native American students, most notably the Native American Center for Wellness Research (for which he was director for five years), the Wolf-Fire scholarship, and a Native American living and learning community.

Patterson was then an assistant professor at the George Warren Brown School of Social Work at Washington University in St. Louis, where he works closely with the Buder Center Scholars. He was also an IHART fellow.

Publications 

Patterson has published articles in Research on Social Work Practice, The Journal of Higher Education, Journal of Social Service Research, Journal of College Student Retention: Research, Theory & Practice, Journal of Sociology and Social Welfare, Alcoholism Treatment Quarterly, and Counselor, among others. He was also the author of the Native American Commitment to Wellness & Respect Blog.

He was featured in The New York Times  for his advocacy of Native American education and guest lecture at Haskell Indian Nations University.

 Patterson Silver Wolf, David A.; Dulmus, Catherine; Wilding, Greg; Barczykowski, Amy; Yu, Jihnhee; Beeler-Stinn, Sara; Asher Blackdeer, Autumn; Harvey, Steven; Rodriguez, Nicole M. (2021-10-02). "Profiles and Predictors of Treatment-Resistant Opioid Use Disorder (TROUD): A Secondary Data Analysis of Treatment Episode Data Set's 2017 Admissions". Alcoholism Treatment Quarterly. 39 (4): 517–532. https://doi.org/10.1080/07347324.2021.1895015. ISSN 0734-7324.
 Patterson Silver Wolf, David A.; BlackDeer, Autumn Asher; Beeler-Stinn, Sara; Zheng, Ken; Stazrad, Kristin (2021-02). "Performance-Based Practice: Clinical Dashboards for Addiction Treatment Retention". Research on Social Work Practice. 31 (2): 205–211. https://doi.org/10.1177/1049731520972798. ISSN 1049-7315
 Patterson Silver Wolf, David A.; Ramsey, Alex T.; Epstein, Joel; Beeler-Stinn, Sara; Asher Black Deer, Autumn (2020-06-18). "Bridges to Sobriety: Testing the Feasibility and Acceptability of a Mobile App Designed to Supplement an Adolescent Substance Use Disorder Treatment Program". Clinical Social Work Journal. https://doi.org/10.1007/s10615-020-00765-w ISSN 1573-3343.

References 

Native American academics
Year of birth missing (living people)
Place of birth missing (living people)
Living people
Scientists with dyslexia
Spalding University alumni
University of Louisville alumni
University at Buffalo faculty
Washington University in St. Louis faculty
American people of Cherokee descent
American people of Irish descent